Michaele is a given name. Notable people with the name include:

Michaele Jordana, Canadian painter and musician
Michaele Pride-Wells (born 1956), American architect and educator
Michaele Salahi (born 1965), American television personality and model
Michaele Schreyer (born 1951), German politician
Michaele Vollbracht (born 1947), American fashion designer